The Letná Stadium, is a football stadium in Prague. It is the home venue of AC Sparta Prague and often hosts the home matches of the Czech Republic national football team. The stadium's capacity is 18,887 seats.

History
The first wooden stadium at its location opened in 1921, in 1930 it hosted the third Women's World Games. The stadium burned in 1934 and a new main reinforced concrete grandstand was built in 1937. In 1969 all the other grandstands were replaced by reinforced concrete ones and capacity was extended to 35,880 spectators. The 1994 reconstruction into its present form saw Letná closed for nine months, until the stadium met all international standards.  The running track was removed and all spectator places were now seated.

Letná has frequently hosted international matches, in October 1989 the venue saw a crowd of 34,000 watch home side Czechoslovakia defeat Switzerland in a qualifying match for the 1990 FIFA World Cup. After the dissolution of Czechoslovakia, Letná continued as an international stadium, hosting matches of the Czech Republic national football team from 1995, including qualification matches for UEFA Euro 1996, in which the Czechs defeated the Netherlands and Norway.

The playing surface was renovated in 2001, including the installation of a new under-soil heating and watering system. This necessitated Sparta playing league matches at the end of the 2000–01 season at the nearby Stadion Evžena Rošického.

In 1994 the stadium was reopened after a complete modernization. The capacity was lowered to 20,854 seats. In 2009 major changes took place at the stadium – barriers between sections were removed, two video screens were installed and infrared radiators were installed to heat the eastern stand. The capacity has been 18,887 since 2009.

Czechia national football team matches

Development of the name
1917–2003: Letná Stadium
2003–2007: Toyota Arena
2007–2009: AXA Arena
2009–2020: Generali Arena
2020–2022: Generali Česká pojišťovna Arena
September 2022–November 2022: Letná Stadium
November 2022–present: epet ARENA

Non-football activities
Since the beginning the stadium has been used as a speaking tribune for events that took place in front of it, in/around the Milada Horaková street and the large "Letná Plain". During the Velvet revolution in 1989, some 800,000 people assembled for anti-government demonstrations at the Letná plain. The speaking tribune was later removed.

Transport connections
The stadium is served by the tram lines 1, 2, 8, 12, 25 and 26. The tram stop Sparta is in front of the stadium in Milada Horáková Street. The nearest metro stations are Vltavská to the east and Hradčanská to the west.

References

External links

 Generali Arena at the official AC Sparta Prague website 
 Photo gallery and data at Erlebnis-stadion.de

Sports venues completed in 1917
Football venues in Prague
Czech First League venues
Czech Republic
AC Sparta Prague
1917 establishments in Austria-Hungary
20th-century establishments in Bohemia
Prague 7